Gustaf David Gilbert John William Hamilton, (20 March 1869 – 11 August 1947) was a Swedish noble and highly decorated soldier, holding Swedish, Finnish and German military honours. He was personally appointed a generalmajor in the Wehrmacht by Adolf Hitler.

Early career 
Gilbert was born on 20 March 1869, in Hedensberg manor, Västmanland. He was the second son to Sir Malcom Hamilton and his wife, Baroness Sophia Lovisa Barnekow. Gilberts father, Sir Malcom was a Fideicommissum to Hedensberg, a post that his older brother Hugo Hamilton would later take over following their father's death.

Gilbert started off his military career in 1891 when he graduated from Karlberg with the rank of second lieutenant. Gilbert tried to volunteer in the Greco-Turkish War in 1897 but was denied. He also tried to, but was denied entry in to both the Second Boer war (1899) and later the Russo-Japanese War (1904).

By the time of the start of the First world war, Hamilton was already a rittmeister (Captain) in the Swedish Army and at the time held command as Chief of the 2nd Squadron in the Royal Life Guards situated in Stockholm.

World War I 
On 27 October 1914, Hamilton took discharge and left for Germany. Whence there he joined the German Army and went into Prussian service with the rank of Major. He served on the eastern front and partook in, among others, the famous Battle at Tannenberg which was a total German victory. He served as a cavalry officer and later as Squadron leader on the Austro-Hungarians Carpathian Front. Between the years 1915–18 he was chief over the 22nd reserve jaeger battalion which, at the time was stationed between Belarus and Ukraine directly north of the city of Pinsk. In 1918 he partook in the Finnish civil war as part of the much larger conflict, the Russian civil war, fighting for the whites against the reds. He did this as Commander of the Squadron "Hamilton" under the Brandenstein brigade as part of German Expeditionary corps Die Ostseedivision.

In June 1918 he was made Chief of the 3rd Cuirassier regiment "Graf Wrangel" in southern ukraine. When the Kaiser abdicated and went into exile in holland, and revolution had broken out across Germany. So at Christmas 1918, he was forced to make a 100 mile long march, comparable to those which the Caroleans undertook 200 years earlier. They made their journey via Kiev all the way back to Königsberg, during which they were constantly attacked in skirmishes. On February 20, 1919, they finally arrived in Königsberg and were received with cheers and a hero's welcome by the populace of the city.

Later life 

After his return to Sweden in 1920, he was given command of the Småland hussars in Eksjö in 1921. Besides his military career he served as an adjutant to the exiled Kaiser Wilhelm II in Doorn for several weeks each year.

On the 25th year anniversary, of the German Victory at Tannenberg, during a ceremony on the 25th of August, 1939, Adolf Hitler personally appointed him as an honorary general of the reserve, with the rank of Generalmajor in the Wehrmacht.

He remained fond and supportive of Germany until his death in 1947.

Gallery

Honours and awards

National 
  Commander 1st Class of the Order of the Sword, 16 June 1928.
 Graduate of the Military Academy Karlberg, 1891.
 Graduate of the Royal Swedish Academy of War Sciences, – (Honorary), 1931.

Foreign
  Commander of the Prussian House Order of Hohenzollern, with swords, latest 1921.
  Recipient of the Prussian Iron Cross 1st Class 1916.
  Recipient of the Prussian Iron Cross 2nd Class 1915.
  Knight of the Finnish Order of the Cross of Liberty 2nd Class, with swords, latest 1921.
  Recipient of the Medal of the Liberation War, 1918.
  Recipient of the Austrian Military Merit Cross, with war decoration, latest 1925.
  Knight of the French Legion of Honour, latest 1921.
  Knight of the Dutch Order of Orange-Nassau, latest 1921.
  Knight Third Class, Third Grade of the Qing Order of the Double Dragon, latest 1921.
  Knight of the Russian Order of St. Anna 3rd Class, latest 1921.

Military ranks

Count Gilbert in popular culture
The popular brand of Swedish pipe tobacco, manufactured since 1924 in Denmark by Swedish Match called "Greve Gilbert Hamiltons Blandning" is named after him.

References

"Svenskar i Krig 1914-1945", Gyllenhaal, L., Westberg, L. (2004)

 List of Imperial German infantry regiments
 List of Imperial German cavalry regiments

Swedish nobility
Swedish people of Scottish descent
1869 births
Commanders First Class of the Order of the Sword
Recipients of the Iron Cross (1914), 1st class
Recipients of the Order of the Cross of Liberty, 2nd Class
People of the Finnish Civil War (White side)
Knights of the Order of Orange-Nassau
Recipients of the Order of St. Anna
1947 deaths
Swedish Army officers
German Army personnel of World War I
Major generals of the German Army (Wehrmacht)
People from Västmanland County